There have been 110 papal elections that have produced popes currently recognized by the Catholic Church as legitimate. There was no fixed process for papal succession before 1059 and popes were often selected with substantial secular involvement, if not outright appointment. Since the promulgation of In nomine Domini (1059), however, suffrage has been limited to the College of Cardinals.

Papal elections since 1276 have taken the form of papal conclaves, which are elections that follow a set of rules and procedures developed in Ubi periculum (1274) and later papal bulls; observance of the conclave varied until 1294, but all papal elections since have followed relatively similar conclave procedures.

Although the cardinals have historically gathered at a handful of other locations within Rome and beyond, only five elections since 1455 have been held outside the Apostolic Palace. Twenty-eight papal elections have been held outside Rome, in: Terracina (1088), Cluny (1119), Velletri (1181), Verona (1185), Ferrara (October 1187), Pisa (December 1187), Perugia (1216, 1264–1265, 1285, 1292–1294, 1304–1305), Anagni (1243), Naples (1254, 1294), Viterbo (1261, 1268–1271, July 1276, August–September 1276, 1277, 1281–1282), Arezzo (January 1276), Carpentras/Lyon (1314–1316), Avignon (1334, 1342, 1352, 1362, 1370), Konstanz (1417) and Venice (1799–1800). Three elections moved between locations while in progress: the elections of 1268–71, 1292–94, and 1314–16.

Papal elections

Elections that elected papal claimants currently regarded by the Catholic Church as antipopes are italicized.

See also
 Conclave
 List of living cardinals

Notes

References
 

History of the papacy
Papal conclaves